Pseudotorynorrhina japonica, the drone beetle, also called , is a large beetle species in the genus Pseudotorynorrhina.

References

Scarabaeidae
Beetles described in 1841
Cetoniinae